Velvet Soup was a Scottish comedy sketch show, starring Gavin Mitchell, Steven McNicoll, Julia Duncanson and Mark McDonnell.

Background

It started as a radio series for BBC Radio Scotland called Velvet Cabaret, named after a nightclub in Glasgow's Sauchiehall Street called The Velvet Rooms where the first series was recorded. After a couple of series, the show was commissioned as a pilot for BBC Scotland and BBC Two, before going to series.

The show first aired in 2001 and ended in 2003.

It has not received an official DVD release.

Episodes

Series 1: 2001

Series 2: 2003

External links
Velvet Soup at BFI
Velvet Soup at Memorable TV

Article on Herald Scotland

2001 Scottish television series debuts
2003 Scottish television series endings
2000s British comedy television series
BBC Scotland television shows
BBC television comedy
BBC Scotland television sketch shows
2001 establishments in Scotland
Television shows set in Glasgow
2000s Scottish television series